Sione Molia (born 5 September 1993) is a New Zealand rugby union player. He made his debut for the New Zealand sevens team at the 2016 USA Sevens. He scored two tries at the 2016 Canada Sevens in New Zealand's semi-final match against Australia to help them into the finals.

Molia was named as a reserve for the New Zealand sevens team to the 2016 Summer Olympics. After Sonny Bill Williams suffered an injury in their first pool match against Japan, Molia replaced him. He is undertaking an applied maths degree at the University of Auckland.

Molia was part of the All Blacks Sevens squad that won a bronze medal at the 2022 Commonwealth Games in Birmingham. He co-captained the team at the Rugby World Cup Sevens in Cape Town. His side won a silver medal after losing to Fiji in the gold medal final.

References

External links 
 Sione Molia All Blacks Sevens profile
 
 
 
 

1993 births
Living people
New Zealand male rugby sevens players
New Zealand international rugby sevens players
Rugby sevens players at the 2016 Summer Olympics
Olympic rugby sevens players of New Zealand
Counties Manukau rugby union players
New Zealand rugby union players
Rugby union players from Auckland
Rugby sevens players at the 2018 Commonwealth Games
Commonwealth Games rugby sevens players of New Zealand
Commonwealth Games gold medallists for New Zealand
Commonwealth Games medallists in rugby sevens
Rugby sevens players at the 2020 Summer Olympics
Olympic medalists in rugby sevens
Olympic silver medalists for New Zealand
Medalists at the 2020 Summer Olympics
Rugby sevens players at the 2022 Commonwealth Games
Medallists at the 2018 Commonwealth Games
Medallists at the 2022 Commonwealth Games